Duncraig Senior High School is an independent public co-educational high day school, located in the suburb of Duncraig,  north of Perth, Western Australia. The current principal is 
Peter Lillywhite.

History 
The school opened in 1979 with 850 students from various primary schools in the surrounding area. It currently has an average of 1642 students. The opening of Padbury Senior High School in 1987 reduced the number of contributing primary schools. At the closure of Craigie Senior High School in 2004 Duncraig took in year nine and ten students belonging to Craigie's Academic Talent Program.

During a freak storm in March 2010 the school was extensively damaged by hail and torrential rain. As a result, the school was closed for a week for all students. Senior school students then returned but students from Year 8 to 10 were not allowed back until late April following the first term holiday break.

See also

 List of schools in the Perth metropolitan area

References

External links 
 School website

Public high schools in Perth, Western Australia
Rock Eisteddfod Challenge participants
Educational institutions established in 1979
1979 establishments in Australia